Doll Skin was an American rock band from Phoenix, Arizona, United States. The original band members met at School of Rock Scottsdale. Their sound blended a blend of punk, metal, alternative, and pop. Doll Skin has been compared to bands ranging from The Donnas, to The Go-Go's, and to The Runaways.  They have received press coverage in Alternative Press, Phoenix New Times Billboard, Rock Sound, Kerrang and Bravewords.

History

2013-2014: Formation 
In 2013, the members began their collaborative work. The initial goal of the project was to compete in a local battle of the bands called Rock Revolution, at Desert Mountain High School in Scottsdale, AZ. In attendance that night was David Ellefson, bassist of the band Megadeth, and a judge. Doll Skin won first place that year with a nearly perfect score, with their time on stage leaving Ellefson convinced of their potential. He approached them a year later after following their local activity with an offer to manage and produce their music.

In November 2014, Doll Skin competed in and were a finalist in the Alice Cooper's "Proof Is In The Pudding" music competition. A cover of Mariah Carey's "All I Want for Christmas Is You" recorded by the band appears on the compilation album "Alice Cooper's Taste of Christmas Pudding 2015" the following year.
 
In December 2014, they were featured in the Phoenix New Times as one of the 10 Best Bands and Musicians in Phoenix Under the Age of 21.  In March 2015, they were again featured in the Phoenix New Times as one of the top 15 bands to watch for in 2015.   In April 2015, they were the cover story of the North Valley Magazine as "Teen Sensations" rock band.

2015-2018: EMP Label Group 
In October 2015, Doll Skin released their debut EP, In Your Face via EMP Label Group and distributed by Megaforce Records (a division of Sony Music Entertainment/RED Distribution) in North America.  The record was produced by David Ellefson, EMP Label Group.  In Your Face was mixed by the American record producer, sound engineer, former owner of Crush Recording Studios in Scottsdale, Arizona and founder of Area 52 Entertainment in Los Angeles, California, Ryan Greene.  In November 2015, Doll Skin was again referenced by the Phoenix New Times as the #1 band under the age of 21 in Phoenix, Arizona by stating that "It would be wholly impossible to discuss underage bands in Phoenix who are rocking it out without bringing Doll Skin up first.".   In December 2015, In Your Face was released in Europe, Asia and Australia by Cargo Records.  The EP, and first single, "Family of Strangers", has received airplay on many prominent stations in the US, Europe and Asia, including the influential LA Rock station KROQ, and their debut song "Family of Strangers" landed on the CMJ Loud Rock Chart at #34.  In January 2016, Doll Skin was included in a list of the "10 Best Female Fronted Bands In Phoenix" by the Phoenix New Times.

In November 2016, Doll Skin was awarded the 'Best Break Through Band' by Heavy Metal Television.  The award was presented by Ed Masley, the music and entertainment reporter for The Arizona Republic.

In December 2016, Alternative Press Magazine featured Doll Skin in the article "7 of the best rising bands under 21" stating: "Don’t let the rainbow hair fool you: Doll Skin are one rough and tough act to follow. Expressing themselves as “glitter-fueled, teenage, punk-rock superheroes,” these Southwest rockers are definitely more than just a pretty face, having toured extensively around the West Coast with bands as diverse as Dead Kennedys and Escape The Fate."

On January 1, 2017, Stone Chrome Radio & TV announced that Doll Skin won the 2016 Listener's Choice Award for "Favorite Female Fronted Band".

On June 16, 2017, Doll Skin released their full-length debut album Manic Pixie Dream Girl.  It debuted on the Billboard Heat-seeker chart at #6 and moved up one spot to #5 in week two.

2019-2023: Hopeless Records debut, Love Is Dead and We Killed Her, and break-up 
In April, 2019, Taco Bell announced that Doll Skin was added as a member of the Spring 2019 Feed The Beat roster. Since 2006, Taco Bell and its "Feed the Beat" program has helped support more than 1,600 touring artists/bands. Taco Bell provides them with free food while on tour and exposure for those artists by giving them a stage at events around the country, featuring their music in national television commercials, and providing amplification through Taco Bell's social presence.

In April 2019, Doll Skin announced that they signed with Hopeless Records, along with the release of their third studio album Love Is Dead And We Killed Her on June 28, 2019. The band also dropped a The Craft-inspired video for the first single "Mark My Words" on April 23 earlier the same year.
On September 24, Doll Skin were revealed to one of the bands to appear on Hopeless Records' Songs That Saved My Life Vol. 2, a charity compilation album released by the label to raise funds for mental health and suicide prevention organizations. The band appears on the album with a cover of the Florence + The Machine song "Shake It Out", dedicating the track to long-time supporter and personal friend of the band Robb Veloz, who had passed away earlier the same year.

In December 2019, Billboard ranked "Mark My Words" at #14 on their list of 'The 25 Best Rock & Alternative Songs of 2019'.  Additionally, Cryptic Rock Magazine selected Love Is Dead And We Killed Her as one of the Top 5 Punk Rock Albums of 2019.

In December 2020, Nicole Rich and Alex Snowden announced their departure from the band. Snowden joined the nu metal band Tallah while Rich moved to Los Angeles and opened a jewelry business called Shop Strawbaby.

On July 15, 2022, Meghan Herring announced her departure from the band.

On January 12, 2023, Doll Skin announced their break-up and final show, which was performed at The Rebel Lounge (The Mason Jar) on March 12.  The band's original members - Meghan Herring, Nicole Rich, and Alex Snowden - reunited for this final performance and played during the majority of Doll Skin's set. Other guests included touring members that were recruited after Rich, Snowden, and Herring's departures.

On March 6, the band would announce its final song "Melancholia" for release on April 5, 2023.

Band members
Former members
 Alex Snowden - lead guitar, backing vocals (2013 - 2020)
 Nicole Rich - bass, backing vocals (2013 - 2020)
 Meghan Herring - drums, backing vocals (2013 - 2022)
 Sydney Dolezal - lead vocals, rhythm guitar (2013 - 2023)

Timeline

Awards 
Heavy Metal Television Awards

|-
| 2016 || Doll Skin || Breakout Band Of The Year || 

Stone Chrome Radio Listener's Choice Awards

|-
| 2016 || Doll Skin || Favorite Female Fronted Band Of The Year || 
|-
| 2017 || Doll Skin || Female Artist Of The Year || 
|-
| 2017 || Doll Skin / "Daughter" || Song Of The Year || 

Billboard Magazine

|-
| 2019 || Doll Skin / "Mark My Words" || Best Rock & Alternative Songs of the Year (#14) || 

Cryptic Rock

|-
| 2019 || Doll Skin / "Love is Dead and We Killed Her" || Best Punk Albums of 2019 ||

Discography

Studio releases 
 In Your Face EP (EMP, 2015)
 In Your Face (Again) (EMP, 2016)
 Manic Pixie Dream Girl (EMP, 2017)
 Love Is Dead and We Killed Her (Hopeless, 2019)

Other appearances 
 Vans Warped Tour '18 2XCD (SideOneDummy, 2018) - "Baby's Breath"  [various artist compilation]
 Ellefson-Sleeping Giants (Combat/EMP, 2019) - "Daughter"  [David Ellefson sampler]
 Songs That Saved My Life, Vol. 2 (Hopeless/Sub City, 2019) - "Shake It Out"  [various artist compilation]

In Your Face (2015)

In Your Face (Again) (2016)

Manic Pixie Dream Girl (2017)

Charted songs/albums

Tours
 Jan 2016: Metal Allegiance West Coast Tour (direct support)
 Jan-Feb 2016:  Ship Rocked Cruise 2016 
 Mar-Apr 2016: Doll Skin Family of Strangers Tour 
 Apr-May 2016: Generation Doom 2016 North American Tour (with OTEP, Lacey Sturm, September Mourning, & Through Fire) 
 Jun 2016: We’re All In This Together Tour (with Hellyeah, Escape the Fate, & Sunflower Dead) 
 Jul-Aug 2016: Equal Rights, Equal Lefts Tour (with OTEP, Fire from the Gods) 
 May 2017: Shut Up Tour
 June 2017: Vans Warped Tour - Vans Warped Tour 2017
 June-Aug 2017: Shut Up Tour (Part 2)
 Sept-Oct 2017: Something Wicked Tour (with One-Eyed Doll)
 Jan-Feb 2018: Rock The Boat Tour
 Jan 2018:  Ship Rocked Cruise 2018
 Mar 2018: Europe/UK Manic Pixie Dream Tour
 Jun-Aug 2018: Vans Warped Tour - Vans Warped Tour 2018 
 Aug 2018: United Kingdom/Europe Tour
 May-Jul 2019: From The Screen To Your Stereo Tour (with New Found Glory, Real Friends, and The Early November) 
 Jul 2019: Vans Warped Tour - Vans Warped Tour 25 Years (Mountain View) 
 Aug-Sep 2019: United Kingdom/Europe Tour (with Trash Boat, Capstan, and The Woes)  
 Nov-Dec 2019: US Tour (with With Confidence, Seaway (band), Between You And Me) 
 Mar 2020: US Tour with Anti-Flag and Grade 2 (band)

Endorsements 
Doll Skin has been endorsed by Music Man, Sinister Guitar Picks, Schecter Guitar Research, ISP Technologies, Beier Drums, D'Addario, Blackstar Amplification, Hartke Systems, Korg, Lag Guitars, SJC Drums, Samson, and Sonal Percussions.

See also
List of Warped Tour lineups by year

References

External links
 
 Reverbnation

Musical groups established in 2013
Musical quartets
Musical groups from Phoenix, Arizona
American pop punk groups
Riot grrrl bands
American alternative metal musical groups
Female-fronted musical groups
Hopeless Records artists
Alternative rock groups from Arizona
2013 establishments in Arizona